In enzymology, a peptide alpha-N-acetyltransferase is an enzyme that catalyzes the chemical reaction

acetyl-CoA + peptide  Nalpha-acetylpeptide + CoA

Thus, the two substrates of this enzyme are acetyl-CoA and peptide, whereas its two products are Nalpha-acetylpeptide and CoA.

This enzyme belongs to the family of transferases, specifically those acyltransferases transferring groups other than aminoacyl groups.  The systematic name of this enzyme class is acetyl-CoA:peptide Nalpha-acetyltransferase. Other names in common use include beta-endorphin acetyltransferase, peptide acetyltransferase, protein N-terminal acetyltransferase, NAT, Nalpha-acetyltransferase, amino-terminal amino acid-acetylating enzyme, and acetyl-CoA:peptide alpha-N-acetyltransferase.

Structural studies

References

 
 
 
 

EC 2.3.1
Enzymes of known structure